The 1948 Illinois Fighting Illini football team was an American football team that represented the University of Illinois during the 1948 Big Nine Conference football season.  In their seventh year under head coach Ray Eliot, the Illini compiled a 3–6 record and finished in eighth place in the Big Ten Conference. End James Valek was selected as the team's most valuable player.

Schedule

References

Illinois
Illinois Fighting Illini football seasons
Illinois Fighting Illini football